arc'tan'gent is the third album by British metal band earthtone9.

The album received critical acclaim on its release. It was rated #16 in both Metal Hammer and Rock Sound magazines' "Albums of 2000" polls, and #24 in Terrorizer'''s equivalent poll. It was also voted #79 by the readers of Kerrang! in their 2005 readers' poll of the 100 best British rock albums ever.

Track listingAll tracks written by earthtone9, except where noted.''
"Tat Twam Asi" – 5:32
"Evil Crawling I" – 2:55
"P.R.D Chaos" – 5:23
Guest vocals by Ishmael Lewis of Liberty 37
"Approx. Purified" – 4:19
"Walking Day" – 7:25
"Star Damage for Beginners" – 2:58
"Ni9e - This Is the Sound..." – 1:23
Additional drums by Gemma Seddon
"Yellow Fever" (earthtone9/Lewis) – 5:06
Guest vocals and lyrics by Ishmael Lewis
"Alpha Hi" – 4:05
"Binary101" – 8:29

References

External links
Copro Records' earthtone9 page

2000 albums
Earthtone9 albums
Albums produced by Andy Sneap